Color was a skateboarding lifestyle magazine published in Vancouver by Fourcorner Publishing Inc. Publication ceased in 2013, after 49 issues.

Edited by Sandro Grison, the magazine's writers included the Canadian short story writer Michael Christie.

References 

Sports magazines published in Canada
Magazines established in 2003
Magazines disestablished in 2013
Skateboarding magazines
Defunct magazines published in Canada
Magazines published in Vancouver